Lophocorona melanora is a moth of the family Lophocoronidae. It was described by Ian Francis Bell Common in 1973. It is only known from the Australian Alps in the Australian Capital Territory.

References

Moths described in 1973
Moths of Australia
Endemic fauna of Australia
Fauna of the Australian Capital Territory
Lophocoronoidea